Oryzavirus is a genus of double-stranded RNA viruses in the family Reoviridae and subfamily Spinareovirinae. Member viruses infect plants and are transmitted by planthoppers. Diseases associated with this genus include: rice stunting, enations on veins of leaves and leaf sheaths, ragged leaves, and flower suppression. There are two species in this genus.

Structure
Viruses in Oryzavirus are non-enveloped, with icosahedral and  Round geometries, and T=13, T=2 symmetry. The diameter is around 70 nm. Genomes are linear and segmented, segments are around 1162 to 3849 base pairs (total size around 26 kb). The genome codes for 12 proteins.

Life cycle
Viral replication is cytoplasmic. Entry into the host cell is achieved by penetration into the host cell. Replication follows the double-stranded RNA virus replication model. Double-stranded RNA virus transcription is the method of transcription. The virus exits the host cell by monopartite non-tubule guided viral movement. The virus is transmitted via a vector (delphacid planthoppers). Transmission routes are vector.

Taxonomy
The genus has two species:

Echinochloa ragged stunt virus
Rice ragged stunt virus

References

External links
 Viralzone: Oryzavirus
 ICTV

Virus genera
Spinareovirinae